A by-election was held in the state electoral district of Coffs Harbour on 3 November 1990. The by-election was triggered by the resignation of Matt Singleton.

Dates

Result	

Matt Singleton resigned.

See also
Electoral results for the district of Coffs Harbour
List of New South Wales state by-elections

References

1990 elections in Australia
New South Wales state by-elections
1990s in New South Wales